Tomlins may refer to:

Sir Thomas Edlyne Tomlins (1762–1841), English legal writer
Thomas Edlyne Tomlins (1804–1872), English legal writer, nephew of Sir Thomas
 Emily Tomlins, Australian actress, collaborator of Eryn Jean Norvill
Keith Tomlins (born 1957), English cricketer
Stan Tomlins (1923–2004), Australian rules footballer
Richard Tomlins (politician) (1563–1650), MP for Ludlow
Richard Tomlins (merchant) (?1564–1650), founder of the Readership in Anatomy at Oxford
Richard Tomlins (judge), Baron of the Exchequer 1649–1660